Eduardo Ramírez Villamizar (27 August 1922 – 24 August 2004) was a Colombian painter and sculptor. He is considered a pioneer of abstract, minimalist, and Constructivist art in Colombia, and in Latin America more broadly.

Early life and education 
Ramírez Villamizar was born on 27 August 1922 in Pamplona, Colombia to parents Adela Villamizar and Jesús Ramírez Castro. He was the youngest of eleven children. His father was a jeweler, and his first experiences making visual art took place in his father's studio.

He and his family moved to Cúcuta in 1929 in seek of work and economic opportunity after being bankrupted in the Great Depression.

In 1940 he moved to Bogotá to study architecture at the National University of Colombia, though he changed his focus to painting in 1944. He was invited by the University of Cauca in 1947 to spend seven months working in Popayán with sculptor Édgar Negret. Negret exposed Ramírez Villamizar to European avant-garde artwork, which he had encountered through colleague and Basque artist Jorge Oteiza. This experience was deeply influential to Ramírez Villamizar's stylistic development in the following years.

Career 

After a trip to Machu Picchu, Peru, he took inspiration in the Inca culture to do Constructivist art.

Later years and death 
He died in Bogotá on 23 August 2004. He was 81 years old.

Awards and recognition 
In 1978, he received the Order of Boyaca, the highest peacetime decoration awarded by the Colombian government. The following year he was also awarded the Medal of ColCultura and the José Eusebio Caro Medal (the latter being awarded by the departmental government of Norte de Santander, Ramírez Villamizar's place of birth). 

The Ramírez Villamizar Museum of Modern Art (es), established in 1990 in his hometown of Pamplona, was named in his honor.

The Venezuelan government awarded him with the Order of Francisco de Miranda in 1993. 

The National University of Colombia, his alma mater, named him Doctor Honoris Causa in 1993. 

A Google Doodle released on 27 August 2019 (the 97th anniversary of his birth) was dedicated to him.

References 

20th-century Colombian sculptors
20th-century Colombian painters
20th-century Colombian male artists
1922 births
2004 deaths
People from Pamplona, Norte de Santander
National University of Colombia alumni